Charter Pilot  is a 1940 drama film, directed by Eugene Forde and produced by Twentieth Century Fox Film Corporation. The film stars  Lynn Bari, Lloyd Nolan, Arleen Whelan and George Montgomery. Charter Pilot depicts pilots flying cargo flights in the Honduras.

Plot
King Morgan (Lloyd Nolan), chief pilot for W. J. Brady Charter Pilots, Inc., and his mechanic, Charlie Crane (George Montgomery) proves he can handle any type of weather in hauling cargo. King is also a famous pilot because his girl friend, Marge Duncan (Lynn Bari) has made him the daring hero of the radio show, named after him. After a long flight from Galveston to Los Angeles delivering soft-shell crabs, King sees Marge to propose marriage. Flustered by her taking time to get ready, he drinks too much and passes out. When he revives, he heads for the Mirrado nightclub where he causes an uproar and is arrested. Marge bails him out next day but when King finally proposes, Marge makes him promise to give up flying. King surprises his boss (Andrew Tombes) by asking for a desk job, working for accountant Horace Sturgeon (Hobart Cavanaugh). Charlie ends up as King's replacement, taking over a charter contract flying ore from a Honduras gold mine.

A competitor named Faber (Henry Victor) wants to get the lucrative gold mine charter contract and conspires to make Charlie look bad. The company looks likely to lose the contract from the gold mine and when Sturgeon is about to fire Charlie, King announces that he will go to Rico, Honduras and take over the charter flights. He convinces his fiancé that their honeymoon will be down south, but as soon as he can, flies to Rico alone. King discovers that their charter business is being sabotaged but has a plan to fly a more direct route over the high mountains using oxygen tanks.

Marge decides to take the radio show to where King is working, even though he no longer wants to be in the broadcast, and is angry with her for following him. After seeing King make a successful test flight in his modified cargo aircraft, Faber finds out that using oxygen will give the Brady Company an advantage. When King is in jail, after becoming drunk in a local cantina, Charlie is given the job of flying the ore, but Faber has damaged the oxygen supply so Charlie will pass out at altitude. Marge wants to have the first flight over the mountains on her radio show and hires Faber to fly her, but King joins them, having discovered the sabotage. When Faber pulls a gun on King, Marge reacts by knocking him out with her microphone.

With King now at the controls, he contacts Charlie and has him turn around. Faber revives and attacks King but Marge stabs Faber with a pin, giving King a chance to knock him out for good. Signing off from the radio show, King and Marge get back together.

Cast
 
 Lynn Bari as Marge Duncan
 Lloyd Nolan as King Morgan
 Arleen Whelan as Raquel Andrews
 George Montgomery as Charlie Crane
 Hobart Cavanaugh as Horace Sturgeon
 Henry Victor as Faber
 
 Etta McDaniel as Ophie
 Andrew Tombes as [W. J.] Brady
 Charles Wilson as Owen 
 Chick Chandler as Fred Adams
 Robert Spindola as Boy
 Sherry Hall as Steven

Production

Principal photography for Charter Pilot began in July 1940 at the Twentieth Century Fox studio and backlots, Los Angeles, California.
After appearing in three Twentieth Century Fox films as a freelance actor, Charter Pilot was the first film that Lloyd Nolan made with the company after signing a studio contract. Established star Lynn Bari has her name appear over Nolan's in the title cards.

Only two flying scenes appeared in the film. Paul Mantz handled the flying duties, using his Ford Trimotor (NC7121). A barley field alongside the Santa Anita race track served as the airfield in the fictional Rico, Honduras.

Reception
Charter Pilot, despite its length, was primarily a B film. Aviation Film Historian James H. Farmer characterized the film as "modest" with the only notable elements being the flying scenes. "The breathtaking aerobatic sequences were staged by Paul Mantz."

References

Notes

Citations

Bibliography

 Farmer, James H. Celluloid Wings: The Impact of Movies on Aviation. Blue Ridge Summit, Pennsylvania: Tab Books Inc., 1984. .
 Pendo, Stephen. Aviation in the Cinema. Lanham, Maryland: Scarecrow Press, 1985. .
 Wynne, H. Hugh. The Motion Picture Stunt Pilots and Hollywood's Classic Aviation Movies. Missoula, Montana: Pictorial Histories Publishing Co., 1987. .

External links
 
 

1940 films
20th Century Fox films
American aviation films
Films set on airplanes
Films directed by Eugene Forde
American drama films
1940 drama films
American black-and-white films
1940s English-language films
1940s American films